Simon Little (born 30 September 1980) is an English bassist, most notable for his work with The Divine Comedy.

A graduate of the Guildhall School of Music and Drama in London, Little joined The Divine Comedy in 2002 and is still a regular member of the band.  He has since toured and recorded with The Duckworth Lewis Method, Clare Teal, Duke Special, Maggie Reilly, A Girl Called Eddy and Chris Difford. As a jazz bass player he plays regularly with Ian Shaw, Lea DeLaria, Symeon Cosburn, and Nina Ferro. Little has also played with Nick Cave and Ben Folds.

Little released a solo bass album Mandala in 2010, where he uses live looping to create ambient soundscapes. He released a second solo album called "The Knowledge of Things To Come" in 2011, following the "Rejectamenta EP" which featured five additional tracks from the Knowledge sessions, and an acoustic album "[un]plugged" in 2012. An improvised trio album "Foreground Music, Vol. I" was released in 2012 with pianist Jez Carr and Iona saxophonist Mike Haughton.

Discography
Office Politics (2019) The Divine Comedy
Foreverland (2016) The Divine Comedy
"Foreground Music, Vol. I" (2012) Jez Carr, Simon Little & Mike Haughton
"Sticky Wickets" (2013) The Duckworth Lewis Method
"The Jazz Cookbook" (2013) Frankie Lewis
"Greatest Video Game Music 2" (2012) the London Philharmonic Orchestra
"Dirk Gently: Original Television Soundtrack" (2012) Daniel Pemberton
"Jing, Jing-A-Ling" (2013) Clare Teal
"[un]plugged" (2012)
"Oh Pioneer" (2012) Duke Special
"The Knowledge of Things To Come" (2011)
"Rejectamenta EP" (2011)
"Hey Ho" (2011) Clare Teal
Mandala (2010)
Mother Courage & Her Children (2010) Duke Special
Be a Santa (2010) Lea DeLaria
Bang Goes the Knighthood (2010) The Divine Comedy
Clare Teal Live at Ebenezer Chapel (2009) Clare Teal
What A Woman Shouldn't Do (2008) Julie McKee
Get Happy (2008) Clare Teal
The Last Temptation of Chris (2008) Chris Difford
Paradisi Carousel (2007) Clare Teal
Victory for the Comic Muse (2006) The Divine Comedy
Drawn To All Things (2006) Ian Shaw
Rowan (2006) Maggie Reilly
South East Side Story (2006) Chris Difford
Breakfast with the Blues (2006) Symeon Cosburn
Whatever It Takes (2006) Jai Cavill
Absent Friends (2004) The Divine Comedy
Live at the London Palladium (DVD 2004) The Divine Comedy
Vollmilch 2004 - Das war Haldern (2004) with The Divine Comedy
Just In Time (2004) Esther Bennett

References

External links

The Divine Comedy official website
Clare Teal official website
All About Jazz review

1980 births
Living people
English session musicians
English male guitarists
Male bass guitarists
English double-bassists
Male double-bassists
The Divine Comedy (band) members
21st-century double-bassists
21st-century English bass guitarists
21st-century male musicians